Goose Lake Township is one of seventeen townships in Grundy County, Illinois, USA.  As of the 2010 census, its population was 1,674 and it contained 774 housing units.

Geography

Cities, towns, villages
 Channahon (southwest edge)
 Coal City (small portion)

Unincorporated towns
 Divine at 
(This list is based on USGS data and may include former settlements.)

Cemeteries
The township contains these two cemeteries: Holderman and Short.

Rivers
 Kankakee River
 Illinois River
 Mazon River

Demographics

School districts
 Coal City Community Unit School District 1

Political districts
 Illinois's 16th congressional district
 State House District 75
 State Senate District 38

References
 
 United States Census Bureau 2007 TIGER/Line Shapefiles
 United States National Atlas

External links
 City-Data.com
 Illinois State Archives

Townships in Grundy County, Illinois
Townships in Illinois
1897 establishments in Illinois